His Neighbor Phil is a 2016 American independent comedy-drama film directed by Simon Erickson and Scott R. Thompson and starring Stephanie Zimbalist and Daniel Roebuck (who also served as producer).

Plot

Cast
Stephanie Zimbalist as Mary
Daniel Roebuck as Harvey
Ellen Dolan as Charlie
Sally Kellerman as Bernadette
Kristi Knudson as Isabel
Rachel Storey as Irene
Bob Bird as Phil
Sue Johnson Flemke as Connie
Ronda Anderson-Sand as Claudia
Arlen Daleske as Jason

References

External links
 
 

2016 films
American comedy-drama films
American films about Alzheimer's disease
American independent films
2010s English-language films
2010s American films